The Archaeological Museum of Puerto de la Cruz is a small archaeological museum located in the town of Puerto de la Cruz (Tenerife, Canary Islands, Spain). One of the most important local museums, it offers an archival collection comprising more than 2,600 specimens of the aboriginal Guanche culture, and a document collection named after researcher Luis Diego Cuscoy.

The Puerto de la Cruz museum has an enormous collection of aboriginal Guanche ceramics, including the remains of several ancient Guanche mummies. It contains several unique pieces native to the island, such as two limpet shells, a finding of Telesforo Bravo, and an anthropomorphic figure or clay idol known as "Guatimac".

Photos

See also 
Guatimac
List of museums in Spain

References

Museum official website 
 
Archaeological Museum of Puerto de la Cruz

Museums in Tenerife
Archaeological museums in Spain
History of museums
Puerto de la Cruz
Guanche
Archaeology of Tenerife